Lombardozzi is an Italian surname.  It comes from a derivative of Lombardo.  Notable people with the surname include:

Carmine Lombardozzi (1913–1992), member of the Gambino crime family in New York
Domenick Lombardozzi (born 1976), American actor
Steve Lombardozzi (born 1960), American baseball player
Steve Lombardozzi Jr. (born 1988), American baseball player, son of Steve

See also
Lombardo

Italian-language surnames